Cosmas Maduka  (born December 24, 1958) CON is a Nigerian businessman and philanthropist, the Founder, President and Chairman of the Coscharis Group.

In 2015, Maduka was featured in Forbes Africa TV Series “Worst Day with Peace Hyde” and was estimated to worth $500million USD and was also reported to have been swindled the sum of N21 billion by Ifeanyi Ubah of Capital Oil and Gas in a business transaction. Maduka has also appeared in CNN Marketplace Africa interview by Zaner Asher.

Early life
Maduka, an Igbo Christian from Nnewi, Anambra State was born into the family of Mr. Peter and Mrs. Rose Maduka in the City of Jos. Maduka began his entrepreneurial journey at the age of six, two years after his father died. He dropped out of primary school and started hawking Akara, a popular Nigerian food staple made from beans to support his mother.

Business career
Maduka formally ventured into business at the age of 17 after being wrongly dismissed with the sum of N200.00 by his uncle who had earlier engaged him as an automobile apprentice. He co-founded a spare parts company known as CosDave with his friend named Dave. The startup also failed sooner than expected and Maduka went to found the Coscharis Motor with the sum of three hundred naira (N300) which focused sales of automobile spare parts in 1977. The name of the company according to him is a combination of his first name, Cosmos and his wife, Charity, whom he married at age 21. Maduka business breakthrough started in 1982, when the Nigeria government granted ten (10) motor companies import license, which Coscharis was selected. Today the Coscharis Group is a conglomerate with a net-worth of $500million with several subsidiaries including Manufacturing, ICT, Petrochemical, Auto care and Auto Components, Automobile Sales and Services, Agric and Agro Allied business sectors. Coscharis Motors is a leading distributors of several brands of luxuries cars including Range Rover, Ford and Jaguar.

In 2015, Coscharis Motors became the sole distributors of the BMW in Nigeria and the first company to build an Assembly Plant of Ford Ranger in Nigeria and won the Auto Brand of the Year at the Marketing World Awards held in Ghana. In 2016, the Anambra State approved 5000 hectares of land for Coscharis Farms to cultivate rice, the project has been reported to generate 3000 jobs upon completion. The Coscharis Group is rated one of the top 50 brands in Nigeria by Top 50 Brands Nigeria.

Maduka attributed his success in business to his affiliation with the Japanese. According to Maduka his early close contact with the Japanese made him develop the values of commitment, humility, precision and hard work which were fundamental to his success in business. He had promised to acknowledge in his autobiography.

Cosmas Maduka seats on the board of several reputable companies and organization. He served as a Director in Access Bank Plc., one of the leading banks in Nigeria for 12 years, from 2000 to 2012.

Mentorship and youth empowerment
Cosmas Maduka engages in business mentorship and empowerment. He relates this in stories during a concluded ‘Stanel Youths Empowerment Master Class’ held at Stanel Dome in Awka, Anambra State how he empowered Dr Stanley Uzochukwu, Chairman and owner of Stanel Group with a business start-up capital of One Hundred and Fifty Million Naira (N150,000,000) and made him one of Nigerian youngest billionaire.

Personal life
Cosmas Maduka is known for his Christian faith, and can be seen frequently preaching at church or youth conferences in Nigeria. According to Maduka he gave his life to Jesus early in life and this had tremendous positive impact on his life, in addition to listening to inspiration talks by the late Reverend William Branham. He was married to Charity Maduka (1958–2021), with four sons and a daughter. He lives in Lagos, Nigeria.

In 2015, Cosmos Maduka appeared on Forbes Africa Cover as the man who turned $1 to $500million, and during was featured in an exclusive interview of Forbes Africa TV Series “My Worst Day with Peace Hyde”.

According to Maduka he loves playing and watching football. He once disclosed during an interview that he has fondess for cars and motorcycles, remarking: "that his whole family are bikers".

Awards
In 2003 Cosmas Maduka received an Honorary Doctor of Business Administration (PhD) University of Nigeria, Nsukka. Maduka also served as the President/Chairman of the Nigerian Table Tennis Federation for 16 years during which Nigeria led Africa in all the events. He led the Nigerian Team to the Olympic Games; Atlanta ‘96, Athens 2000, Sidney 2004 and Beijing 2008. In 2012 was inducted as a Harvard Business School Alumni having completed an Executive Education Program. Cosmos Maduka was among the few persons honoured by President Goodluck Jonathan with the National Honours of the Commander of the Order of the Niger (CON) in 2012.

References

1958 births
Living people
Nigerian automobile salespeople
Igbo businesspeople
Nigerian Christians
Nigerian billionaires
Commanders of the Order of the Niger
Nigerian company founders
20th-century Nigerian businesspeople
21st-century Nigerian businesspeople
Nigerian chairpersons of corporations
People from Anambra State